The OTs-21 Malysh (meaning "kid") is a 9 mm semi-automatic pistol designed by the KBP Instrument Design Bureau for special applications where concealment is a key priority.

The Malysh operates on the simple blowback principle; it is a double action only design with the ammunition capacity limited to five 9×18mm Makarov rounds (can use only 57-N-181S cartridges) in a box magazine with a base extension for more comfortable holding and firing. It features an internal hammer and there are no protrusions to hinder rapid withdrawal from a pocket or holster. The pistol has no safety other than the need for a definite pressure on the trigger. There are also no sights other than a groove along the top of the slide, emphasizing the intention that the OTs-21 Malysh is limited to very short-range engagements.

Variants 
 OTs-21 (ОЦ-21) - 9×18mm Makarov version
 OTs-21S (ОЦ-21С) - 9x17mm version
 OTs-26 (ОЦ-26 «Малыш») - 5.45x18mm version

Users 
  - used in law enforcement

See also
List of Russian weaponry

References

External links
KBP Instrument Design Bureau – Official site

5.45×18mm firearms
Semi-automatic pistols of Russia
9×18mm Makarov semi-automatic pistols
.380 ACP semi-automatic pistols
KBP Instrument Design Bureau products